The 1997–98 season was the 29th campaign of the Scottish Men's National League, the national basketball league of Scotland. The season featured 10 teams. Midlothian Bulls won their seventh league title.

Teams

The line-up for the 1997-98 season featured the following teams:

Boroughmuir
Edinburgh Burger Kings
Clark Erikkson Fury
Dunfermline Reign
Glasgow Sports Division
Glasgow Gators
Midlothian Bulls
Paisley
St Mirren

League table

 Source: Scottish National League 1997-98 - Britball

References

Scottish Basketball Championship Men seasons
basketball
basketball